Orthocephalus coriaceus is a species of plant bug in the family Miridae. It is found in Europe including European Russia, Ukraine and the Balkans and North America.

Orthocephalus coriaceus lives on various daisy family plants (Asteraceae) such as Leucanthemum, Tanacetum, Hieracium , Achillea, Centaurea, Artemisia .  The bugs suck both on the leaves and stems, as well as on the reproductive organs of the plants.  In North America it appears as a horticultural pest introduced from Europe.

References

Further reading

External links

 

Orthotylinae
Articles created by Qbugbot
Insects described in 1777